Lewis Franklin Powell Jr. (September 19, 1907 – August 25, 1998) was an American lawyer and jurist who served as an associate justice of the Supreme Court of the United States from 1972 to 1987.

Born in Suffolk, Virginia, he graduated from both Washington and Lee Law School and Harvard Law School and served in the United States Army Air Forces during World War II. He worked for Hunton & Williams, a large law firm in Richmond, Virginia, focusing on corporate law and representing clients such as the Tobacco Institute. His Powell Memorandum became the blueprint for the rise of the American conservative movement and the formation of a network of influential right-wing think tanks and lobbying organizations, such as The Heritage Foundation and the American Legislative Exchange Council.  In 1971, President Richard Nixon appointed Powell to succeed Associate Justice Hugo Black. He retired from the Court during the administration of President Ronald Reagan, and was eventually succeeded by Anthony Kennedy.

His tenure largely overlapped with that of Chief Justice Warren Burger, and Powell was often a key swing vote on the Burger Court. His majority opinions include First National Bank of Boston v. Bellotti and McCleskey v. Kemp, and he wrote an influential opinion in Regents of the University of California v. Bakke. He notably joined the majority in cases such as United States v. Nixon, Roe v. Wade, Plyler v. Doe, and Bowers v. Hardwick.

Early life and education 
Powell was born in Suffolk, Virginia, the son of Mary Lewis (Gwathmey) and Louis Franklin Powell. Powell set out to attend Washington and Lee University where he became president of his fraternity, managing editor of the student newspaper, and a member of the yearbook staff. His major was in commerce, but he also studied law. Powell had always planned on becoming a lawyer because he viewed their roles as shaping history. He graduated in 1929 with a B.A. magna cum laude and Phi Beta Kappa. He also was named recipient of the Algernon Sydney Sullivan Award for "generous service to others".

Powell then attended Washington and Lee University School of Law and in 1931 graduated first in his class. He received a Master of Laws degree from Harvard Law School in 1932, wrote a LL.M. thesis, entitled "Relation between the Virginia Court of Appeals and the State Corporation Commission", and was one of two U.S. Supreme Court justices to have earned an LL.M. degree.

He was elected president of the student body as an undergraduate with the help of Mosby Perrow Jr., and the two served together on the Virginia State Board of Education in the 1960s. Powell was a member of Phi Kappa Sigma fraternity and the Sigma Society. At a leadership conference, he met Edward R. Murrow, and they became close friends.

In 1936, he married Josephine Pierce Rucker with whom he had three daughters and one son. She died in 1996.

Career

Military service, 1939–1945
During World War II, he first tried to join the United States Navy but was rejected because of poor eyesight, so he joined the US Army Air Forces as an Intelligence officer. After receiving his commission as a first lieutenant in 1942, he completed training at bases near Miami, Florida and Harrisburg, Pennsylvania. He was assigned to the 319th Bombardment Group, which moved to England later that year. He served in North Africa during Operation Torch and was later assigned to the Headquarters of the Northwest African Air Forces. There, Powell served in Sicily during the Allied invasion of Sicily.

In August 1943, he was assigned to the Intelligence staff of the Army Air Forces in Washington, D.C. Slated for assignment as an instructor at the facility near Harrisburg, he worked instead on several special projects for the AAF headquarters until February 1944. He was then assigned to the Intelligence staff of the Department of War and then the Intelligence staff of United States Strategic Air Forces in Europe. While there Colonel Powell wrote in the aftermath of the 13-15 February 1945 Bombing of Dresden that "Personally, I consider this very fortunate indeed as the German people are being taught for the first time in modern history what it means to have war on their own soil."

Powell was assigned to the Ultra project, as one of the officers designated to monitor the use of intercepted Axis communications. He worked in England and in the Mediterranean Theater and ensured that the use of Ultra information was in compliance with the laws of war, and that the use of such information did not reveal the source, which would have alerted that the code had been broken.

Powell advanced through the ranks to colonel, and received the Legion of Merit, Bronze Star Medal, and French Croix de Guerre with bronze palm. He was discharged in October 1945.

Legal career
In 1941, Powell served as Chairman of the American Bar Association's Young Lawyers Division.

Powell was a partner for more than a quarter of a century at Hunton, Williams, Gay, Powell and Gibson, a large Virginia law firm, with its primary office in Richmond, now known as Hunton Andrews Kurth. Powell practiced primarily in the areas of corporate law, especially in the fields of mergers and acquisitions and railroad litigation.

From 1961 to 1962 Powell served as Chair of the American Bar Association's Standing Committee on the Economics of Law Practice, which later evolved into the ABA Law Practice Division. During his tenure as Chair of the Committee, The Lawyers Handbook was first published and distributed to all attorneys who joined the ABA that year. In its preface, Powell wrote, "The basic concept of freedom under law, which underlies our entire structure of government, can only be sustained by a strong and independent bar. It is plainly in the public interest that the economic health of the legal profession be safeguarded. One of the means toward this end is to improve the efficiency and productivity of lawyers."

From 1964 to 1965 he was elected President of the ABA. Powell led the way in attempting to provide legal services to the poor, and he made a key decision to cooperate with the federal government's Legal Services Program. Powell was also involved in the development of Colonial Williamsburg, where he was both a trustee and general counsel.
From 1964 until his court appointment in 1971 he was a board member of Philip Morris
and acted as a contact point for the tobacco industry with Virginia Commonwealth University. Through his law firm, Powell represented the Tobacco Institute and various tobacco companies in numerous cases.

Virginia government, 1951–1970 
Powell played an important role in local community affairs. From 1951 he served on the Richmond School Board  and was its Chairman from 1952 to 1961. Powell presided over the school board at a time when the Commonwealth of Virginia was locked in a campaign of defiance against the Supreme Court's decision in Brown v. Board of Education (1954), which desegregated public schools. Powell's law firm, although not Powell himself, represented one of the defendant school districts in Davis v. County School Board of Prince Edward County, which was consolidated later into Brown.

The Richmond School Board had no authority at the time to force integration, however, as control over attendance policies had been transferred to the state government. Powell, like most white Southern leaders of his day, did not speak out against the state's defiance, but fostered a close relationship with many black leaders, such as civil rights lawyer Oliver Hill, some of whom offered key support for Powell's Supreme Court nomination. In 1990, Powell swore in Virginia's first black governor, Douglas Wilder.

From 1961 to 1969, Powell served on the Virginia Board of Education; he was Chairman from 1968 to 1969.

Powell Memorandum, 1971 
On August 23, 1971, prior to accepting Nixon's nomination to the Supreme Court, Powell was commissioned by his neighbor Eugene B. Sydnor Jr., a close friend and education director of the U.S. Chamber of Commerce, to write a confidential memorandum for the chamber entitled "Attack on the American Free Enterprise System," an anti-Communist and anti-New Deal blueprint for conservative business interests to retake America. It was based in part on Powell's reaction to the work of activist Ralph Nader, whose 1965 exposé on General Motors, Unsafe at Any Speed, put a focus on the auto industry putting profit ahead of safety, which triggered the American consumer movement. Powell saw it as an undermining of the power of private business and a step toward socialism. His experiences as a corporate lawyer and a director on the board of Phillip Morris from 1964 until his appointment to the Supreme Court made him a champion of the tobacco industry who railed against the growing scientific evidence linking smoking to cancer deaths. He argued, unsuccessfully, that tobacco companies' First Amendment rights were being infringed when news organizations were not giving credence to the cancer denials of the industry.

The memo called for corporate America to become more aggressive in molding society's thinking about business, government, politics and law in the US. It inspired wealthy heirs of earlier American industrialists, the Earhart Foundation (whose money came from an oil fortune), and the Smith Richardson Foundation (from the cough medicine dynasty) to use their private charitable foundations−which did not have to report their political activities−to join the Carthage Foundation, founded by Richard Mellon Scaife in 1964. The Carthage Foundation pursued Powell's vision of a pro-business, anti-socialist, minimally government-regulated America based on what he thought America had been in the heyday of early American industrialism, before the Great Depression and the rise of Franklin D. Roosevelt's New Deal.

The Powell Memorandum ultimately came to be a blueprint for the rise of the American conservative movement and the formation of a network of influential right-wing think tanks and lobbying organizations, such as the Business Roundtable, The Heritage Foundation, the Cato Institute, Manhattan Institute for Policy Research and the American Legislative Exchange Council (ALEC), and inspired the U.S. Chamber of Commerce to become far more politically active. CUNY professor David Harvey traces the rise of neoliberalism in the US to this memo. Historian Gary Gerstle refers to the memo as "a neoliberal call to arms." Political scientist Aaron Good describes it as an "inverted totalitarian manifesto" designed to identify threats to the established economic order following the democratic upsurge of the 1960s.

Powell argued, "The most disquieting voices joining the chorus of criticism came from perfectly respectable elements of society: from the college campus, the pulpit, the media, the intellectual and literary journals, the arts and sciences, and from politicians." In the memorandum, Powell advocated "constant surveillance" of textbook and television content, as well as a purge of left-wing elements. He named consumer advocate Nader as the chief antagonist of American business. Powell urged conservatives to undertake a sustained media-outreach program, including funding neoliberal scholars, publishing books, papers, popular magazines, and scholarly journals, and influencing public opinion.

This memo foreshadowed a number of Powell's court opinions, especially First National Bank of Boston v. Bellotti, which shifted the direction of First Amendment law by declaring that corporate financial influence of elections by independent expenditures should be protected with the same vigor as individual political speech. Much of the future Court opinion in Citizens United v. Federal Election Commission relied on the same arguments raised in Bellotti.

Although written confidentially for Sydnor at the Chamber of Commerce, it was discovered by Washington Post columnist Jack Anderson, who reported on its content a year later (after Powell had joined the Supreme Court). Anderson alleged that Powell was trying to undermine the democratic system; however, in terms of business's view of itself in relation to government and public interest groups, the memo could be alternatively read to simply convey conventional thinking among businessmen at the time. The explicit goal of the memo was not to destroy democracy, though its emphasis on political institution-building as a concentration of big business power, particularly updating the Chamber's efforts to influence federal policy, has had that effect. Here, it was a major force in motivating the Chamber and other groups to modernize their efforts to lobby the federal government. Following the memo's directives, conservative foundations greatly increased, pouring money into think-tanks. This rise of conservative philanthropy led to the conservative intellectual movement and its increasing influence over mainstream political discourse, starting in the 1970s and 1980s, and due chiefly to the works of the American Enterprise Institute and the Heritage Foundation.

Copies of the memorandum and related materials are currently available at the Scholarly Commons website of the Washington and Lee University School of Law.

Supreme Court tenure, 1972–1987 
In 1969, Nixon asked him to join the Supreme Court, but Powell turned him down. In 1971, Nixon asked him again. Powell was unsure, but Nixon and his Attorney General, John N. Mitchell, persuaded him that joining the Court was his duty to the nation. One of the primary concerns that Powell had was the effect leaving his law firm and joining the high court would have on his personal financial status, as he enjoyed a very lucrative private practice at his law firm. Another of Powell's major concerns was that as a corporate attorney, he would be unfamiliar with many of the issues that would come before the Supreme Court, which, as now, heard very few corporate law cases. Powell feared that would place him at a disadvantage and make it unlikely that he would be able to influence his colleagues.

Nixon nominated Powell and William Rehnquist to the Court on the same day, October 21, 1971. Powell took over the seat of Hugo Black after being confirmed by the Senate 89-1 on December 7, 1971 (the lone "nay" came from Oklahoma Democrat Fred R. Harris). On the day of Powell's swearing-in, when Rehnquist's wife Nan asked Josephine Powell if this was the most exciting day of her life, Josephine said, "No, it is the worst day of my life. I am about to cry."

Lewis Powell served from January 7, 1972 until June 26, 1987, when he retired from the Court.

Powell was among the 7–2 majority who legalized abortion in the United States in Roe v. Wade (1973). Powell's pro-choice stance on abortion stemmed from an incident during his tenure at his Richmond law firm, when the girlfriend of one of Powell's office staff bled to death from an illegal self-induced abortion.

Powell, who dissented in the case of Furman v. Georgia (1972), striking down capital punishment statutes, was a key mover behind the Court's compromise opinion in Gregg v. Georgia (1976), which allowed the return of capital punishment but only with procedural safeguards.  In Coker v. Georgia (1977), a convicted murderer escaped from prison and, in the course of committing an armed robbery and other offenses, raped an adult woman. The State of Georgia sentenced the rapist to death. Justice Powell, acknowledging that the woman had been raped, expressed the view that "the victim [did not] sustain serious or lasting injury" and voted to set the death penalty aside. In that same case, Powell also wrote to rebuke the plurality's statement that "for the rape victim, life may not be nearly so happy as it was, but it is not over and normally is not beyond repair," instead stating that "[s]ome victims are so grievously injured physically or psychologically that life is beyond repair."

His opinion in Regents of the University of California v. Bakke (1978), joined by no other justice in full, represented a compromise between the opinions of Justice William J. Brennan, who, joined by three other justices, would have upheld affirmative action programs under a lenient judicial test, and the opinion of John Paul Stevens, joined by three other justices, who would have struck down the affirmative action program at issue in the case under the Civil Rights Act of 1964. Powell's opinion striking down the law urged "strict scrutiny" to be applied to affirmative action programs but hinted that some affirmative action programs might pass Constitutional muster. 

In the controversial case of Snepp v. U.S. (1980), the Court issued a per curiam upholding the lower court's imposition of a constructive trust upon former CIA agent Frank Snepp and its requirement for preclearance of all his published writings with the CIA for the rest of his life. In 1997, Snepp gained access to the files of Justices Thurgood Marshall (who had already died) and William J. Brennan Jr. (who voluntarily granted Snepp access) and confirmed his suspicion that Powell had been the author of the per curiam opinion. Snepp later pointed out that Powell had misstated the factual record and had not reviewed the actual case file (Powell was in the habit of writing opinions based on the briefs alone) and that the only justice who even looked at the case file was John Paul Stevens, who relied upon it in composing his dissent. From his days in counterintelligence during World War II, Powell believed in the need for government secrecy and urged the same position on his colleagues during the Court's consideration of 1974's United States v. Nixon.

Powell wrote the majority opinion in First National Bank of Boston v. Bellotti (1978), which overturned a Massachusetts law restricting corporate contributions to referendum campaigns not directly related to their business.

Powell joined the 5–4 majority opinion in Plyler v. Doe, holding that a Texas law forbidding undocumented immigrant children from public education was unconstitutional. Powell had a fairly conservative record in deciding cases, but joined the Court's four liberal Justices to declare the law unconstitutional.

Powell was the swing vote in Bowers v. Hardwick, in which the Court upheld Georgia's sodomy laws. He was reportedly conflicted over how to vote. A conservative clerk, Michael W. Mosman, advised him to uphold the ban, and Powell, who believed he had never met a gay person, not realizing that one of his own clerks was a closeted homosexual, voted to uphold Georgia's sodomy law. However, he, in a concurring opinion, expressed concern at the length of the prison terms prescribed by the law. The Court, 17 years later, expressly overruled Bowers in Lawrence v. Texas, . In 1990, after his retirement from the Court, he said, "I think I made a mistake in the Hardwick case," marking one of the few times a justice expressed regret for one of his previous votes. Scholars would later conclude that Powell unknowingly hired more gay clerks than any other Justice. Paul M. Smith, the gay attorney who argued in favor of overturning Bowers is a former clerk for Justice Powell.

Powell also expressed post-retirement regret over his majority opinion in McCleskey v. Kemp (1987), where he voted to uphold the death penalty against a study that demonstrated that, except as punishment for the most violent of crimes, murderers sentenced for killing white victims were up to forty times more likely to receive the death penalty than people who killed black victims. In an interview with his biographer, he stated that he would abolish the death penalty altogether.

Retirement and death, 1987–1998 
Powell was nearly 80 years old when he retired from his position as Supreme Court justice in June 1987. His career on the bench was summed up by Gerald Gunther, a professor of constitutional law at Stanford Law School, as "truly distinguished" because of his "qualities of temperament and character," which "made it possible for him, more than any contemporary, to perform his tasks in accordance with the modest, restrained, yet creative model of judging."

He was succeeded by Anthony Kennedy. Kennedy was the third nominee for his position. The first, Robert Bork, was not confirmed by the United States Senate. The second, Douglas H. Ginsburg, withdrew his name from consideration after admitting to having smoked marijuana both as a college undergraduate and with his students while a law professor.

Following his retirement from the high court, he sat regularly on various United States Courts of Appeals around the country.

In 1990, Douglas Wilder asked Powell to swear him in as governor of Virginia, and the first elected African-American governor in the United States.

Powell died at his home in the Windsor Farms area of Richmond, Virginia, of pneumonia, at 4:30 in the morning of August 25, 1998, at the age of 90. He is buried in Richmond's Hollywood Cemetery.

Legacy
In her 2002 book, The Majesty of the Law, Justice Sandra Day O'Connor wrote, "For those who seek a model of human kindness, decency, exemplary behavior, and integrity, there will never be a better man."

Powell's personal and official papers were donated to his alma mater, Washington and Lee University School of Law, where they are open for research, subject to certain restrictions. A wing at Sydney Lewis Hall, home of W&L Law, which houses his papers, is named for him.

J. Harvie Wilkinson, a judge on the Fourth Circuit, and former law clerk for Justice Powell, wrote a book titled Serving Justice: A Supreme Court Clerk's View describing the experience.

In 1993, President Bill Clinton signed into law an act of Congress renaming the Federal courthouse at Richmond, Virginia, in his honor, the Lewis F. Powell Jr. United States Courthouse.

See also 

 List of justices of the Supreme Court of the United States
 List of law clerks of the Supreme Court of the United States (Seat 1)
 List of United States Supreme Court justices by time in office
 United States Supreme Court cases during the Burger Court
 United States Supreme Court cases during the Rehnquist Court

References

Bibliography

External links 

 
 FBI file on Lewis F. Powell, Jr. at vault.fbi.gov
 

1907 births
1998 deaths
20th-century American judges
United States Army Air Forces personnel of World War II
American Presbyterians
Deaths from pneumonia in Virginia
Harvard Law School alumni
Lawyers from Richmond, Virginia
Military personnel from Virginia
People from Suffolk, Virginia
Presidents of the American Bar Association
Recipients of the Croix de Guerre 1939–1945 (France)
Recipients of the Legion of Merit
School board members in Virginia
United States Army Air Forces officers
United States federal judges appointed by Richard Nixon
Justices of the Supreme Court of the United States
Virginia Democrats
Virginia lawyers
Washington and Lee University School of Law alumni